During the 1993–94 English football season, Coventry City F.C. competed in the FA Premier League.

Season summary
Coventry City's 27th successive season in the top flight began with a superb 3–0 win at Arsenal in which striker Micky Quinn scored a hat-trick. Coventry's surprisingly good form continued through the opening months of the season, so it was a surprise to all when manager Bobby Gould handed in his notice on 23 October 1993. Phil Neal, formerly of Bolton Wanderers, was announced as Gould's successor; despite having no experienced outside the league's third tier, he was able to defy the odds and keep Coventry well clear of the relegation which they had been tipped for in the last four seasons.

Kit
Coventry City's kit was manufactured by Ribero and sponsored by French car maker Peugeot.

Final league table

Results
Coventry City's score comes first

Legend

FA Premier League

FA Cup

League Cup

Squad

Left club during season

Transfers

Out
 Peter Billing - Port Vale, £35,000, May 1993
 Andy Pearce - Sheffield Wednesday
 Keith Rowland - West Ham United, £110,000
 Terry Fleming - Northampton Town
 Micky Gynn - Stoke City
 Craig Middleton - Cambridge United
 David Smith - Birmingham City

Award
 Coventry City Player of the Year: Phil Babb

References

Coventry City F.C. seasons
Coventry City